The Dinaric race, also known as the Adriatic race, were terms used by certain physical anthropologists in the early to mid-20th century to describe the perceived predominant phenotype of the contemporary ethnic groups of southeast Europe (a sub-type of the Caucasoid race).

History and physiognomy
The concept of a Dinaric race originated with Joseph Deniker in the late 19th century, but became most closely associated with the writings of Carleton S. Coon and Nazi eugenicist Hans F. K. Günther. The term was derived from the Dinaric Alps (the western part of Southeastern Europe) which was supposed to be the principal habitat of the race.

According to Jan Czekanowski, the Dinaric race is a mixed type consisting of the Nordic race and Mediterranean race, which he proves by anthropological research involving geographical data, cephalic index, and characteristic racial features. He states:

The Dinaric type is characterized by quite light skin, dark hair from dark brown to dark blonde, and a wide range of eye color; tall stature, a brachycephalic skull, long face, a very narrow and prominent nose, sometimes aquiline; a slender body type, and very big feet.

Characteristics were defined as very tall, mostly mesomorph bodily build, with relatively long legs and short trunk and a long arm span. The overall anatomy of the head was said to be brachycephalic to hyperbrachycephalic (Cranial index: 81–86), i.e. a combination of high breadth of head and medium length of the neurocranium, whose back part is often somewhat flattened (planoccipital).

The type has been described as follows:

The vertical height of the cranium is high. Eyes are set relatively close and the surrounding tissue defines them as wide open. The iris is most often brown, with a significant percentage of light pigmentation in the Dinaric population. The nose is large, narrow and convex. The face is long and orthognathic, with a prominent chin, and also wide. The form of the forehead is variable, but not rarely it is bulbous. The hair color is usually dark brown, with black-haired and blond individuals in minority, blondness being the characteristic of the more Central European, morphologically similar Noric race (a race intermediate between Nordic and Dinaric races). The skin is lacking the rosy color characteristic for Northern Europe as well as the relatively brunet pigmentation characteristic for the southernmost Europe and on a geographical plane it is of medium pigmentation and often it is variable.

Origin and distribution

Several theories were advanced regarding the genesis of the Dinaric race. Most researchers agreed that this race was autochthonous to its present habitat from the Neolithic period. Both Günther and Coon claimed that the Bell-Beaker people of the European Bronze Age were at least partially Dinaric.

Coon also argued, however, in The Origin of Races (1962), that the Dinaric and some other categories "are not races but simply the visible expressions of the genetic variability of the intermarrying groups to which they belong."

He referred to the creation of this distinctive phenotype from the mixing of earlier separate groups as "dinaricisation". In his view Dinarics were a specific type that arose from ancient mixes of the Mediterranean race and Alpine race.

According to the Dinaric model, Dinarics were to be found mainly in the mountainous areas of southeastern Europe: Montenegro, Bosnia and Herzegovina, Croatia, Serbia, Slovenia, Austria, Albania, part of northwestern Bulgaria, and northwestern Northern Macedonia. Northern and eastern Italy was considered mostly a Dinaric area as well as western Greece, Romania, Moldova, western Ukraine, southeastern German-speaking areas, and parts of southeastern France.

"Noric" subtype
The Noric race was a racial category proposed by the anthropologist Victor Lebzelter. The "Noric race" was supposed to be a sub-type of the Dinaric race more Nordic in appearance than standard Dinaric peoples. The term derived from Noricum, a province of the Roman Empire roughly equivalent to southern Austria and northern Slovenia. The term is not to be confused with Nordic.

Norics were characterized by tall stature, brachycephaly, nasal convexity, long face and broad forehead. Their complexion was said to be light, and blondness combined with light eyes to be their anthropologic characteristic.

Citations

Cited sources

External links
 Examples of Dinarics (plates 35–43) from Coon's The Races of Europe
 Renato Biasutti on Caucasoid Subraces preserved at the Internet Archive

Historical definitions of race
History of the Balkans